Thomas Joseph Banks (1828–1896), sometimes known as "Thomas John Banks", was a British portrait and landscape painter.

He died at Goathland, and an obituary notice in The British Architect described him as "a Yorkshire artist of considerable local repute".

His works include:
 Henry Baines (1793–1878) of York
 Thomas Bateman and his son
 The Farne Islands

References

1828 births
1896 deaths
English portrait painters
English landscape painters
19th-century English painters
English male painters
Artists from Yorkshire
19th-century English male artists